Phobetron dyari is a species of slug caterpillar moths in the genus Phobetron and the family Limacodidae.

It was identified by American entomologists, William Barnes and Benjamin Dann Walsh in 1926.

References

Limacodidae
Moths described in 1926
Taxa named by William Barnes (entomologist)
Taxa named by Benjamin Dann Walsh